Pierre Delbecque (born 17 April 1930) is a Belgian former field hockey player. He competed in the men's tournament at the 1960 Summer Olympics.

References

External links
 

1930 births
Possibly living people
Belgian male field hockey players
Olympic field hockey players of Belgium
Field hockey players at the 1960 Summer Olympics
People from Etterbeek
Field hockey players from Brussels